Wanton was launched in New Brunswick in 1797. She started sailing from Bristol in 1801, trading between the United Kingdom and Africa. After the war with France in 1803 she briefly cruised as a privateer, and made one capture. She then sailed to the West Indies and thereafter apparently traded between the United States and the West Indies.

Career
She arrived at Bristol from Virginia on 9 June 1801. She first appeared in Lloyd's Register in 1801.

Captain Robert Amory acquired a letter of marque on 2 July 1803. On 6 August 1803 a French vessel, prize to Wanton, arrived at Bristol. The French vessel had been sailing from San Domingo when taken. The vessel was Victoire, of 160 tons (bm).

Wanton, Haken, master, was reported to have been captured while sailing from Tobago to St Vincents. The next issue of Lloyd's List reported that Wanton had arrived at St Vincents. Wanton, Steele, master, was next reported to have arrived at Charleston from St Vincents.

Thereafter Wanton continued to be listed in the registries for some years, but only appeared sporadically in Lloyd's List and trading between the United States and the West Indies.

Notes

Citations

1797 ships
Age of Sail merchant ships of England
Privateer ships of the United Kingdom